Racketeers in Exile is a 1937 American crime film directed by Erle C. Kenton and starring George Bancroft, Evelyn Venable and Wynne Gibson.

Cast
 George Bancroft as William Waldo  
 Evelyn Venable as Myrtle Thornton  
 Wynne Gibson as 'Babe' DeVoe  
 Marc Lawrence as 'Blackie' White  
 John Gallaudet as 'Happy' 
 George McKay as 'Horseface'  
 William Burress as Thornton 
 Helen Lowell as Mrs. Abigail Thornton  
 Jack Clifford as Thyrus Jamison 
 Garry Owen as Sy 
 Jonathan Hale as Alden Parker  
 Richard Carle as Regan Langdon aka 'Porky' 
 Ray Bennett as 1st Killer
 Edward Cecil as Parker's Butler  
 Georgie Cooper as Purity League Member 
 Robert Dudley as Purity League Member  
 Betty Farrington as Sadie's Mother  
 Harry Fleischmann as 2nd Killer  
 Sam Flint as Finance Man  
 Mary Gordon as Irish Woman  
 Alfred P. James as Purity League Member  
 Gladden James as G-Man  
 Edward LeSaint as Physician  
 Wilfred Lucas as Finance Man  
 James T. Mack as Minister  
 Ralph Malone as G-Man  
 Walter Merrill as G-Man  
 Wedgwood Nowell as Finance Man 
 Jessie Perry as Purity League Member  
 Kathryn Sheldon as Purity League Member  
 Tommy Tucker as Little Boy  
 Lois Verner as Sadie  
 Pierre Watkin as Chief G-Man  
 Crawford Weaver as G-Man

References

Bibliography
 Hardy, Phil. The BFI Companion to Crime. University of California Press, 1997.

External links
 

1937 films
1937 crime films
American crime films
Films directed by Erle C. Kenton
Columbia Pictures films
American black-and-white films
1930s English-language films
1930s American films